Shady Grove (also known as Duck River) is an unincorporated community in Hickman County, Tennessee, United States.

History
The Duck River post office was located at Shady Grove from December 28, 1846, to March 12, 1977. The community was named for the shade a grove of trees provided the town site.

References

Unincorporated communities in Hickman County, Tennessee
Unincorporated communities in Tennessee